R618 road may refer to:
 R618 road (Ireland)
 R618 (South Africa)